Larkfield fort  is a ringfort (rath) and National Monument located in County Longford, Ireland. On the Record of Monuments and Places it bears the code LF006-021----.

Location
Larkfield fort is located east of Lough Gowna,  from the edge. The nearest village is Mullinalaghta,  to the southeast.

Description

The ringfort is a univallate bank and ditch with an entrance in the east.

References

Archaeological sites in County Longford
National Monuments in County Longford